The Wenlock, Craven Arms and Lightmoor Extension Railway was a railway in Shropshire, England. It was built as two portions either end of the Much Wenlock and Severn Junction Railway between 1864 and 1867 and formed part of the Wellington to Craven Arms Railway. For much of its working life it was worked by the Great Western Railway and subsequently the Western Region of British Railways. 

The line was authorised by Act of Parliament on 22 July 1861 to extend the line to Coalbrookdale in the north and to Marsh Farm Junction, just north of Craven Arms on the Shrewsbury and Hereford Railway in the south. Its length was 19½ miles.

The route today

Railway
The only portion that survives as a railway is the section between Lightmoor Junction and Buildwas for which the last use was the transport of coal to Ironbridge Power Station.

Footpath
Much of the remainder forms part of the Jack Mytton Way long distance pathway.

See also 
 Albert Edward Bridge spanning the River Severn at Coalbrookdale.

References

Early British railway companies
Railway lines opened in 1867
Closed railway lines in the West Midlands (region)
Ironbridge Gorge